Joe Statler (born December 8, 1952) is an American politician, currently serving as a Republican member of the West Virginia House of Delegates since 2020, representing the 51st district, which includes Morgantown and the majority of Monongalia County. Statler also served in the House from 2014 to 2018, losing reelection in the 2018 elections. 

As of 2021, Statler is the only Republican in the five-member 51st District.

Personal life 
Statler was born on December 8, 1952, in Morgantown, West Virginia to Willis and Maxine Statler. He is a graduate of Clay-Battelle High School. Statler is a retired coal miner and owns a 250 acre farm in Core, West Virginia. Prior to his service in the Legislature, Statler served on the Monongalia County Board of Education from 2002 to 2012.

Electoral history

2018 election

Primary election

General election

2020 election

Primary election

General election

References

External links 

 Official website
 Joe Statler at West Virginia Legislature
 Joe Statler at Ballotpedia

Members of the West Virginia House of Delegates
Politicians from Morgantown, West Virginia
21st-century American politicians
Living people

1952 births